James, Jim, or Jimmy Hayes may refer to: 

 James Hayes (Prince Rupert's secretary) (1637–1694), Prince Rupert's secretary and first Deputy Governor of the Hudson's Bay Company
 James Hayes (died c. 1731) (1676–bef. – 1731/32), British Member of Parliament for Winchelsea
 James Hayes (1715-1800), British Member of Parliament for Downton
 James Hayes (bishop) (1889–1980), Archbishop of Cagayan de Oro
 James Hayes (Australian politician) (1831–1908), Australian politician from New South Wales
 James Hayes (cricketer), English cricketer
 James Hayes (actor), featured in British TV serials such as The Jury
 James A. Hayes (1921–2000), American politician from California
 James C. Hayes (born 1946), American pastor and politician, mayor of Fairbanks, Alaska, 1992–2001
 James E. Hayes (1865–1898), Supreme Knight of the Knights of Columbus
 James L. Hayes (1915–1989), American educator
 James Martin Hayes (1924–2016), Canadian prelate of the Roman Catholic Church
 James P. Hayes (born 1964), American politician from New York
 James W. Hayes, Hong Kong historian
 James Thomas Hayes (bishop) (1847–1904), Bishop of Trinidad and Tobago, 1889–1904
 Jim Hayes (baseball) (1913–1993), Major League pitcher (1935 Washington Senators)
 Jim Hayes (American football) (1940–2001), American football defensive lineman
 Jim Hayes (basketball) (1948–2009), American basketball player
 Jimmy Hayes (born 1946), American politician from Louisiana
 Jimmy Hayes (ice hockey) (1989–2021), American professional ice hockey player

See also
 James Hays (disambiguation)
 James Hay (disambiguation)